The Prince of Pappenheim is a 1952 West German comedy film directed by Hans Deppe and starring Viktor de Kowa,  Hannelore Schroth and Grethe Weiser. It was based on a 1923 operetta of the same name which had previously been made into a 1927 silent film.

It was shot at the Spandau Studios in West Berlin and on location in Baden-Württemberg. The film's sets were designed by Emil Hasler and Walter Kutz.

Cast

References

Bibliography 
 Goble, Alan. The Complete Index to Literary Sources in Film. Walter de Gruyter, 1999.

External links 
 

1952 films
1952 comedy films
German comedy films
West German films
1950s German-language films
Films directed by Hans Deppe
Remakes of German films
German black-and-white films
Films shot at Spandau Studios
1950s German films